Sierra de Tepoztlan or Tepozteco Mountain is located near the village of Tepoztlán, a Pueblo Mágico, in Morelos, Mexico. The mountain range, "vulnerable to landslides, erosions, and flooding", contains only small areas of land which are appropriate for cultivation. It contains the ruins of a small, pre-Hispanic, Ometochtli temple, known as El Tepozteco. It is believed that there were a number of settlements at one time at the mountain base.

The Sierra is in El Tepozteco National Park, which was established in 1937.

References

Bibliography

External links

Mountains of Mexico
Landforms of Morelos